Adrián Huertas del Olmo (born 21 August 2003) is a Spanish professional motorcycle racer. He is currently competes in the Supersport World Championship with MTM Kawasaki. He previously competed in the Supersport 300 World Championship for the same team, having won the championship in 2021.

Career statistics

Supersport 300 World Championship

Races by year
(key) (Races in bold indicate pole position; races in italics indicate fastest lap)

Supersport World Championship

Races by year
(key) (Races in bold indicate pole position; races in italics indicate fastest lap)

 Season still in progress.

References

External links

2003 births
Living people
Sportspeople from Madrid
Spanish motorcycle racers
Spanish sportsmen
Supersport 300 World Championship riders
Supersport World Championship riders